Blackstone Plaza is a high-rise office building in Omaha, Nebraska, U.S.. It is located at 3555 Farnam Street at the corner of South 36th Street. It was built from 1960 to 1961, and it was designed in the modernist architectural style. 

It has been home to the headquarters of Kiewit Corporation and Berkshire Hathaway since 1962 when Warren Buffett dissolved his six partnerships into one partnership headquartered in this building.

It is named after Peter Kiewit's construction company, Kiewit Corporation, considered to be one of the most profitable construction companies in the world and once called "Colossus of Roads."

References

Office buildings completed in 1961
Skyscraper office buildings in Omaha, Nebraska
Berkshire Hathaway
1961 establishments in Nebraska